Peter Varney is a New Hampshire politician, and currently serves in the New Hampshire House of Representatives.

Varney has been serving in the New Hampshire House of Representatives since 2014. He attended the University of Canterbury from 1992 to 1998.

References

Living people
Republican Party members of the New Hampshire House of Representatives
21st-century American politicians
Year of birth missing (living people)